Hook Norton Football Club is a football club based in Hook Norton, near Banbury, Oxfordshire England.

History
The club was established in 1898, and was initially a works team for the Brymbo Ironstone Company. In the 1980s they were playing in the Banbury & District League and were Premier Division champions for the first time in 1984–85. After winning the league on four more occasions, the club moved up to the Oxfordshire Senior League in 1998. They were promoted to the Premier Division at the first attempt, and went on to win the Premier Division in 1999–2000.

After winning the Oxfordshire Senior League Premier Division again the following season, Hook Norton were promoted to Division One West of the Hellenic League. The club won Division One West at the first attempt, earning promotion to the Premier Division, although they had to move to Banbury United's Spencer Stadium in order to play at that level as their Bourne ground did not meet the ground grading regulations.

Hook Norton finished in the Premier Division relegation zone at the end of the 2003–04 season and were relegated back to Division One West. A third-place finish in Division One West in 2006–07 saw the club promoted to the Premier Division again. However, they finished bottom of the Premier Division in 2009–10 and were relegated to Division One West for a second time. In 2014–15 the club won the league's Supplementary Cup.

In June 2017 Hook Norton withdrew from the Hellenic League and disbanded due to a lack of committee members. However, the club reformed in 2018 and joined Division Three of the Witney & District League. In 2018–19 they won the league's Supplementary Cup, beating Wootton 4–1 in the final. The club also finished third in Division Three, earning promotion to Division Two.

Honours
Hellenic League
Division One West champions 2001–02
Supplementary Cup winners 2014–15
Witney & District League
Supplementary Cup winners 2018–19
Oxfordshire Senior League
Champions 1999–2000, 2000–01
Banbury & District League
Champions 1984–85

Records
Best FA Cup second qualifying round, 2015–16
Best FA Vase second round, 2008–09
Record attendance: 533 vs Weston-super-Mare, FA Cup second qualifying round, 26 September 2015

References

External links

Football clubs in England
Football clubs in Oxfordshire
1898 establishments in England
Association football clubs established in 1898
Banbury District and Lord Jersey FA
Oxfordshire Senior Football League
Hellenic Football League
Witney and District League
Works association football teams in England